Nikola Šafarić (born 11 March 1981) is a Croatian former footballer who played as midfielder. He current works as sporting director of NK Varaždin.

Club career

Early years
In 1998, Šafarić started his football career in Varaždin for Varteks as a young 17-year-old midfielder. He quickly established himself as irreplaceable in the Varteks team. Before his 20th birthday he has already played around 40 league games for Varteks and scoring several goals in the process.

Best years with Varteks
From the 2002–03 season, Nikola finally stepped up on the big scene. He became a first team regular in Varteks and in the next 5 seasons he scored 32 goals in the domestic league only. His good games as well as passion for football and leadership ability could not go unnoticed so he was appointed as team`s captain. Nikola Šafarić is also a great penalty and free kick taker and although he could play every possible position in the midfield he says he "plays best as a defensive midfielder."

Subsequent teams
In the beginning of the 2007–08 season, Nikola Šafarić was sold to Rijeka. In Rijeka, Nikola was welcomed by many as a great acquisition. He instantly "grabbed" first team position and was one of the team's best players by scoring two goals and adding three more assists, which helped Rijeka to finish at the fourth place in the Prva HNL.

On 31 August 2008, Šafarić signed a 2-year contract with Slaven Belupo.

He returned to the Varteks for the 2010–2011 season. Before the season started, the club lost its main sponsorship, the Varteks clothing factory, and changed its 52-year-old name to NK Varaždin. The club immediately fell into financial difficulties, and would be expelled from the top-level Prava HNL the following season, when it stopped paying its players. Šafarić avoided this, having signed a two-year contract with Kaposvári in 2011, but this will come to play later in Šafarić's career.

Šafarić signed a two-year contract with Zavrč in 2013. In January 2015, he signed for the Druga HNL outfit NK Inter Zaprešić.

Šafarić signed with Međimurje for the 2015–2016 season, then returned to the city of Varaždin for the 2016–17 season. His earlier club, NK Varaždin, had declared bankruptcy and folded in 2015, but Šafarić had signed with a different NK Varaždin, unassociated with the earlier team. This club had formed in 2012, as Varaždin ŠN, than changed to NK Varaždin when the bankrupt team discarded the name.

International career
Nikola Šafarić was a member of every Croatia national football team categories (U17, U19, U21, senior team). That's why he was predicted a great international club career. But, unfortunately, up to this date Nikola has made only three appearances for Croatia national football team. His international debut came against Israel in the 1–0 friendly win at Varaždin on 18 August 2004. His second and third international cap came on 2006 Carlsberg Cup in Hong Kong on which Croatia finished third.

References

External links
 
PrvaLiga profile 

1981 births
Living people
Sportspeople from Čakovec
Association football midfielders
Croatian footballers
Croatia youth international footballers
Croatia under-21 international footballers
Croatia international footballers
NK Varaždin players
HNK Rijeka players
NK Slaven Belupo players
Kaposvári Rákóczi FC players
NK Zavrč players
NK Inter Zaprešić players
NK Međimurje players
Croatian Football League players
Nemzeti Bajnokság I players
Slovenian PrvaLiga players
First Football League (Croatia) players
Second Football League (Croatia) players
Croatian expatriate footballers
Expatriate footballers in Hungary
Croatian expatriate sportspeople in Hungary
Expatriate footballers in Slovenia
Croatian expatriate sportspeople in Slovenia